Henry or Harry Potter (October 4, 1881 – January 24, 1955) was an American golfer who competed in the 1904 Summer Olympics. In 1904 he was part of the American team which won the silver medal. Potter was the best player for his team together with his teammate Francis Newton he placed sixth in this competition. In the individual competition he finished 15th in the qualification and was eliminated in the first round of the match play.

References

External links
 Profile
 Profile at Sports-Reference

American male golfers
Amateur golfers
Golfers at the 1904 Summer Olympics
Olympic silver medalists for the United States in golf
Medalists at the 1904 Summer Olympics
1881 births
1955 deaths